The 1981 Australian Open was a tennis tournament played on grass courts at the Kooyong Lawn Tennis Club in Melbourne in Victoria in Australia. It was the 70th edition of the Australian Open and was held from 30 November through 6 December 1981 for the women and from 24 December 1981 through 3 January 1982 for the men.

Seniors

Men's singles

 Johan Kriek defeated  Steve Denton, 6–2, 7–6(7–1), 6–7(1–7), 6–4
• It was Kriek's 1st career Grand Slam singles title.

Women's singles

 Martina Navratilova defeated  Chris Evert, 6–7(4–7), 6–4, 7–5
• It was Navratilova's 3rd career Grand Slam singles title and her 1st title at the Australian Open.

Men's doubles

 Mark Edmondson /  Kim Warwick defeated  Hank Pfister /  John Sadri 6–3, 6–7, 6–3
• It was Edmondson's 2nd career Grand Slam doubles title and his 2nd title at the Australian Open.
• It was Warwick's 3rd career Grand Slam doubles title and his 3rd and last title at the Australian Open.

Women's doubles

 Kathy Jordan /  Anne Smith defeated  Martina Navratilova /  Pam Shriver 6–2, 7–5 
• It was Jordan's 4th career Grand Slam doubles title and her 1st and only title at the Australian Open.
• It was Smith's 4th career Grand Slam doubles title and her 1st and only title at the Australian Open.

Mixed doubles
The competition was not held between 1970 and 1986.

Juniors

Boys' singles
 Jörgen Windahl defeated  Pat Cash 6–4, 6–4

Girls' singles
 Anne Minter defeated  Corinne Vanier 6–4, 6–2

Boys' doubles
 David Lewis and  Tony Withers won the title

Girls' doubles
 Maree Booth and  Sharon Hodgkin won the title

External links
 Official website Australian Open

 
 

 
1981 in Australian tennis
December 1981 sports events in Australia
January 1982 sports events in Australia
1981,Australian Open